Maryland House of Delegates District 3A is one of the 67 districts that compose the Maryland House of Delegates. Along with subdistrict 3B, it makes up the 3rd district of the Maryland Senate. District 3A includes part of Frederick County and is represented by two delegates.

Demographic characteristics
As of the 2020 United States census, the district had a population of 94,029, of whom 72,483 (77.1%) were of voting age. The racial makeup of the district was 52,465 (55.8%) White, 16,152 (17.2%) African American, 582 (0.6%) Native American, 5,324 (5.7%) Asian, 32 (0.0%) Pacific Islander, 9,044 (9.6%) from some other race, and 10,377 (11.0%) from two or more races. Hispanic or Latino of any race were 17,778 (18.9%) of the population.

The district had 59,013 registered voters as of October 17, 2020, of whom 13,643 (23.1%) were registered as unaffiliated, 15,651 (26.5%) were registered as Republicans, 28,983 (49.1%) were registered as Democrats, and 297 (0.5%) were registered to other parties.

Past Election Results

1982

2002

2006

2010

2014

2018

References

3A